The Africa Movie Academy Award for Best Diaspora Feature is an annual merit by the Africa Film Academy to reward the best feature films by non-Africans for the year. It was introduced in the 2011 ceremony.

References

Lists of award winners
Africa Movie Academy Awards